Halas Hall (officially the PNC Center at Halas Hall) is a building complex in Lake Forest, Illinois, that serves as the headquarters of the Chicago Bears of the National Football League (NFL). Named after founder George Halas and designed by Peter Rose of Peter Rose + Partners, the building hosts the team's front office, as well as indoor and outdoor practice facilities. The franchise spent $20 million to build the complex in 1997.

In 2013, the Bears announced that Halas Hall would be renovated to include an event center, broadcast studio, outdoor patio, and dining facility, as well as additional conference rooms and staff offices. They also announced that they would expand the parking lot and renovate the entrance to the lobby. The event centers feature interactive digital displays, video monitors and memorabilia such as the Bears' 1963 NFL Championship Game trophy. The new facility was designed by Richard Preves & Associates, PC. On April 21, 2015, PNC Financial Services purchased the naming rights to the new building, naming it the PNC Center at Halas Hall.

On November 17, 2017, Ted Phillips announced the franchise would expand and renovate Halas Hall to effectively double its size. The project began in March 2018 and concluded in August 2019. After renovations were finished in which training rooms were expanded and new playing fields were added, the Bears moved their training camp to Halas Hall for the 2020 season.

References

External links
 Official Chicago Bears Website
 Chicago Bears' History

Chicago Bears
Lake Forest, Illinois
American football venues in Illinois
Buildings and structures in Lake County, Illinois